Jets Overhead are a Canadian alternative rock band formed in 2003 and based in Victoria, British Columbia, Canada.

Band history

Formation and debut
Singer Adam Kittredge conceived the name Jets Overhead while observing air traffic patterns in London, England. Jets Overhead was formed in 2003 by Kittredge, guitarist Piers Henwood (cousin of Kittredge), bassist Jocelyn Greenwood (high school friend of Kittredge), and the band's first drummer, Brendan Pye. Soon after, vocalist Antonia Freybe-Smith joined, and Pye was replaced by Luke Renshaw, their current drummer. The band's first release was 2003's self-titled EP, Jets Overhead, which charted No. 42 on the CMJ music charts.

Bridges: Early adoption of voluntary purchase model
In 2006, Jets Overhead made their first full-length album, Bridges, available for free download on their website under a voluntary purchase ("pay what you want") model, over a year before British rock group Radiohead eventually popularized this model with In Rainbows. Jets Overhead were eventually recognized as one of the first bands who attempted to address the challenges presented by digital music distribution and online trading, with the band's website stating at the time that: "new systems for distributing music should be driven by the public rather than by existing paradigms which no longer apply to the digital world." Bridges was produced by Neil Osborne, lead singer of Canadian rock group 54-40, and mixed by Warne Livesey. Bridges explores themes about island living and the west coast of Canada. It eventually led to the band's first Juno nomination in 2007.

No Nations
Jets Overhead did not repeat its original voluntary purchase model for the 2009 release of No Nations; however, elements of the album were made available on the band's website under a Creative Commons license. No Nations was also produced by Neil Osborne, and was mixed by Grammy winner Malcolm Burn. The album was primarily recorded at a remote location on Hornby Island, and deals with themes of individuality and community. "Heading For Nowhere", the first single from No Nations, charted nationally at Canadian rock radio, and saw regular play on KCRW in Los Angeles. During the No Nations touring cycle, Jets Overhead made debut performances at prominent US festivals including Coachella and Bonnaroo. Prior to the release of No Nations, singers Adam Kittredge and Antonia Freybe-Smith were married. No Nations marked the band's first US release on Vapor Records.

Touring and festival history
Jets Overhead has performed at the Coachella Festival, Bonnaroo Music Festival, Sasquatch! Music Festival, Expo 2010 Shanghai, South by Southwest, CMJ Music Marathon, Rifflandia, North by Northeast, Popkomm, Transmission,  Canadian Music Week, Edgefest, the 2010 Winter Olympics, and the Bridge School Benefit. The band has toured internationally in the UK, Germany, Ireland, and China. They have also played with Broken Social Scene, The Dandy Warhols, The Dears, The Frames, Our Lady Peace, Powderfinger, Sam Roberts, Tegan and Sara, The Temper Trap, and 54-40.

Television and film
Jets Overhead songs have been featured on the television shows House, Bones, Pretty Little Liars, Love Bites, Whistler, Falcon Beach, Jozi-H, Godiva's, The Best Years, and ReGenesis. They have also been featured in the film The Last Time, and a commercial for Brazilian subsidiary of mobile phone carrier Telecom Italia Mobile.

Collaborations and compilations
Antonia Freybe-Smith co-wrote and contributed vocals to the DJ Phynn track "Hello Love," which was released in 2010 on the Black Hole Recordings label, along with a remix by Mr. Pit. In 2006, Grammy nominated producer and DJ Morgan Page remixed Jets Overhead song "All The People." In 2007, Jets Overhead contributed a cover of the Buffalo Springfield song "Mr. Soul" to Borrowed Tunes II: A Tribute to Neil Young, in support of the Bridge School. "Get It Right" was featured on the Canadian 2006 War Child benefit compilation Help!: A Day in the Life, along with Coldplay, Radiohead, City & Colour, and other artists.

Awards and nominations
Jets Overhead were nominated for New Group of the Year at the 2007 Juno Awards. No Nations won Monday Magazine's Favorite Album of 2009. The music video for "Heading for Nowhere" was nominated for Music Video of the Year at the 2010 Leo Awards, and the music video for "Sun Sun Sun" was voted as a top 20 video at the 2004 Indie Music Video Awards.

Equipment
Bassist Jocelyn Greenwood plays a 1978 Rickenbacker 4001 bass through an Ampeg SVT cab, an Electro-Harmonix Hot Tubes pedal, and a Fender Blues Junior guitar amp. Her equipment provides the distinctive fuzzy bass sound on "Heading For Nowhere" and many of the band's recordings. On the album No Nations, Adam Kittredge and Luke Renshaw are both credited as playing an ARP Solina synthesizer, considered a very rare synth.

Members

Current
Antonia Freybe-Smith
Jocelyn Greenwood
Piers Henwood
Adam Kittredge
Luke Renshaw

Former
Brendan Pye

Discography

Studio albums
 Bridges (2006)
 No Nations (2009)
 Boredom and Joy (2012)

EPs
 Jets Overhead (2003)
 Bystander (2011)

Compilation albums
 Lost Melodies: A Collection of Rarities, Demos, and Remixes (2007)
 Live At Sasquatch Festival 2010 (2010)
 The Timing: 15 Years of Jets Overhead (2018)

Singles

See also

Music of Canada
Canadian rock
List of Canadian musicians
List of bands from Canada
List of bands from British Columbia
:Category:Canadian musical groups

References

External links

 Interview with Jets Overhead

Musical groups established in 2003
Canadian indie rock groups
Musical groups from Victoria, British Columbia
2003 establishments in British Columbia